I Dream of Mimi, known as  in Japan, is a Japanese series written and illustrated by Kaoru Shintani. It was serialized in Hakusensha's seinen manga magazine Young Animal from 1993 to 1997, with its chapters collected in three tankōbon volumes. The series was adapted into a three-episode original video animation (OVA) produced by Pink Pineapple and animated by OLM in 1997. It was released in North America by The Right Stuf International.

Plot
A young student named Akira has saved up a large sum of money to buy the latest and best personal computer - only to find out they are sold out.  He then finds what he thinks is the same model number in an alley, and buys the large boxed-up machine from a shady character nearby.  When he gets home, Akira is shocked to find that his new computer is a bio-android shaped like a pretty young lady.  He is even more shocked when she tells him that she constantly needs his semen to refresh her physical memory.

Characters

Media

Manga
Written and illustrated by Kaoru Shintani, I Dream of Mimi was serialized in Hakusensha's seinen manga magazine Young Animal from 1993 to 1997. Hakusensha collected its chapters in three tankōbon volumes, released from May 29, 1995, to December 17, 1997. The series was re-released by Media Factory in two bunkoban volumes, published on April 5 and May 2, 2003.

Volume list

Original video animation
A three-episode original video animation (OVA), produced by Pink Pineapple and animated by OLM, was released from April 25 to September 26, 1997. The three episodes were released on DVD on May 25, 2001.

In North America, the OVA was licensed by The Right Stuf International Inc. and released on home video on March 26, 2001. The OVA was re-released on March 27, 2004.

Episode list

Reception
Christopher Macdonald of Anime News Network wrote that the OVA is "much better animated than the average hentai", praising its comedy and stating that, despite being labeled as an "erotic comedy", it can be "watched and enjoyed by anyone who isn't offended by the sexual content." Stig Høgset of THEM Anime Reviews praised the series for its art, calling it "lovely" and for its characters, but criticized it for its ""enemy of the month" syndrome rearing its head in episode two and onwards" and its brevity.

The series was reviewed by four critics of AnimeOnDVD; Jamal Sacranie wrote that the OVA is "perfect for anyone looking for a light hentai or just wants something funny", commenting that despite being labeled as a hentai, the scenes are not graphic, do not actually show anything happening and that "most of it is implied." Michael Thomas highlighted the "high technical quality" of the OVA, praising the attention to detail in costumes, character designs, settings, and choreography. Thomas noted the influence that it probably had on other bishōjo android series, like Chobits, Mahoromatic and  Hand Maid May. Thomas called it a "fun, racy, adult romp into cyberspace" and a"good parody of the cyber-culture that exists in Japan and America." 	Luis Cruz wrote that labeling the OVA as a hentai "does it a disservice", stating that it is primarily a comedy and that the sexual content is "along the lines of the American Pie and Porky's franchises but is less graphic than the two." Cruz wrote that despite the little development, the core of the series is the parody and comedy, which is delivered in enough quantities to allow "overlook such plot flaws". Cruz called it a "R-rated Chobits" and that it is "[a]musing, cute, and a little bit naughty." Chris Beveridge wrote that while the jokes do get repeated throughout, the OVA has "other computer related humor that is a lot of fun here", adding that it is "light and fun and in the end, not demeaning at all, which is a trap a lot of ecchi/hentai shows really fall (or leap) into. Definitely recommended."

References

External links
  
 

1993 manga
1997 anime OVAs
Android (robot) comics
Hakusensha franchises
Hakusensha manga
Hentai anime and manga
Kaoru Shintani
Pink Pineapple
Science fiction anime and manga
Seinen manga
Sex comedy anime and manga